The Kläui ligand is the anion {(C5H5)Co[(CH3O)2PO]3}−.  The ligand, popularized by Wolfgang Kläui, binds metals and metalloids via a facial O3 donor set.  Related tridentate and tripodal anionic ligands include trispyrazolylborates.

The ligand is derived from the cationic complex of trimethylphosphite {(C5H5)Co[P(OCH3)3]3}2+ via an Arbuzov reaction.  Using other phosphites and other cyclopentadienyl ligands, a large variety of derivatives are possible.  The parent acid {(C5H5)Co[(CH3O)2PO]3}H is highly soluble in water (270 g/100 mL).  Its pKa is about 2.  Many complexes have been described, including bis(chelate) complexes of the type {M[{(C5H5)Co[(CH3O)2PO]3}2]n+ (M = Co(II), Mn(II), Bi(III), etc.).

References

Organocobalt compounds
Half sandwich compounds
Cyclopentadienyl complexes
Phosphites
Tripodal ligands